Elżbietów may refer to the following places:
Elżbietów, Lublin Voivodeship (east Poland)
Elżbietów, Garwolin County in Masovian Voivodeship (east-central Poland)
Elżbietów, Sochaczew County in Masovian Voivodeship (east-central Poland)
Elżbietów, Kalisz County in Greater Poland Voivodeship (west-central Poland)
Elżbietów, Środa Wielkopolska County in Greater Poland Voivodeship (west-central Poland)